The name Bahçesaray comes from Persian باغچه سرای bāghche-sarāy which means the Garden Palace. It may refer to:

Places

Turkey
 Bahçesaray (district), a district of Van Province
 Bahçesaray, Vezirköprü, a village in the district of Vezirköprü, Samsun Province

Crimea
 Bakhchysarai, a city in Crimea